Airbus Training Centre Europe is one of the eight centres of the European aerospace company Airbus dedicated to airline pilot and engineer training. Located at Blagnac, close to Toulouse (France), the centre is approved by civil aviation authority to deliver courses on Airbus A300, A310, A320 family, A330, A340, A350XWB and A380.

The centre is equipped with six full flight simulators.

Airbus also has training centres in Hamburg, Miami, Beijing, Singapore, Bangalore, New Delhi and Mexico.

References

External links
Official website 

Aviation schools in France
Education in Toulouse
Airbus